Gerina Michelle Mendoza Piller (born March 29, 1985) is an American professional golfer, currently playing on the LPGA Tour. She turned pro in 2007 following a decorated career as a collegiate golfer at the University of Texas El Paso. In 2009, Mendoza appeared on the Golf Channel reality television competition The Big Break.

Childhood and amateur career
Born in Roswell, New Mexico, Gerina Mendoza attended Goddard High School and won the state golf championship in 2003 and also was an all-state volleyball player.

She enrolled in at the University of Texas at El Paso (UTEP) in 2003 where she played all four years, winning four tournaments in her senior year. She was the 2007 Conference USA individual champion, Player of the Year and the UTEP Female Athlete of the Year.

Professional career
Mendoza turned pro in September 2007 and attempted to qualify that fall for the LPGA Tour. She did not succeed and played in 2008 on the Futures Tour. She attempted again to qualify for the LPGA Tour in 2008, again failing.

In airing of 2009, filmed at an unknown time, Mendoza appeared on Big Break Prince Edward Island. Six women and six men competed for a grand prize of $100,000 in cash. Contestant Derek was the only male to reach the final four and prevailed in a 2-hole elimination match with Gerina by 1 stroke.

In 2009, she earned conditional status on the LPGA Tour for 2010 and played the entire season on the Duramed Futures Tour, where she recorded seven top-10 finishes and a career-best tie for second at both the iMPACT Classic and the USI Championship. She finished 5th on the Futures Tour money list in 2010, earning her full playing privileges on the LPGA Tour for 2011.

She finished 68th on the LPGA official money list in 2012, retaining her full playing card for 2012. Piller improved in 2012, with two top-ten finishes and a 48th-place finish on the year-end LPGA official money list.

Piller took sabbatical from the LPGA Tour in 2018 due to the birth of her first child, a son, Ajeo James Piller, born April 26, 2018.

Personal life
Mendoza married fellow professional golfer Martin Piller in January 2011. They live in Flower Mound, Texas. She is of Mexican American descent.

Results in LPGA majors
Results not in chronological order before 2019.

^ The Evian Championship was added as a major in 2013

CUT = missed the half-way cut
NT = no tournament
T = tied

Summary

Most consecutive cuts made – 15 (2014 LPGA – 2017 U.S. Open)
Longest streak of top-10s – 1 (six times)

LPGA Tour career summary

 Official through 2022 season.

* Includes matchplay and other events without a cut.

World ranking
Position in Women's World Golf Rankings at the end of each calendar year.

Team appearances
Professional
Solheim Cup (representing the United States): 2013, 2015 (winners), 2017 (winners)
International Crown (representing the United States): 2016 (winners)

Solheim Cup record

References

External links

Profile at Yahoo! Sports
Profile at UTEP official site

American female golfers
LPGA Tour golfers
Solheim Cup competitors for the United States
Olympic golfers of the United States
Golfers at the 2016 Summer Olympics
Golfers from New Mexico
UTEP Miners athletes
American sportspeople of Mexican descent
People from Roswell, New Mexico
Sportspeople from Plano, Texas
1985 births
Living people
21st-century American women